The Anderson School District is a school district based in Sand Springs, Oklahoma, United States. It consists of a single school that serves Kindergarten-Grade 8.

See also
List of school districts in Oklahoma

References

External links
 Anderson Overview
 Anderson Public School

School districts in Oklahoma
Education in Tulsa County, Oklahoma